The 6th European Film Awards were presented on 4 December 1993, in Potsdam, Germany. The winners were selected by the members of the European Film Academy.

Awards

Best Film

Best Documentary

Lifetime Achievement Award

References

External links 
 European Film Academy Archive

1993 film awards
European Film Awards ceremonies
Euro
1993 in Europe
December 1993 events in Europe